Bex railway station is a railway station in the municipality of Bex, in the Swiss canton of Vaud. It is an intermediate stop on the Simplon line and the terminus of the Bex–Villars–Bretaye line.

Services 
 the following services stop at Bex:

 RegioExpress:

References

External links 
 
 

Railway stations in the canton of Vaud
Swiss Federal Railways stations